Stephanopoides is a genus of spiders in the family Thomisidae. It was first described in 1880 by Keyserling. , it contains 4 species.

References

Thomisidae
Araneomorphae genera
Spiders of Central America
Spiders of South America
Taxa named by Eugen von Keyserling